Law 102 of 1983 empowered the Prime Minister to designate certain areas to be declared as protectorates. A Prime Minister's decree defines the limits of each protected area and sets the basic principles for its management and for the preservation of its resources. Twenty four protectorates have been declared so far. Note that these are completely unrelated to colonial "protectorates".

Protectorates declared in the framework of Law 102 of year 1983

External links 
 Ministry of Environment Egyptian Environmental Affairs Agency - Natural Protectorates Description
http://www.eeaa.gov.eg/Portals/0/eeaaReports/N-protect/Protectorates2013_A3En_Ar_Existing_Future.pdf

National parks of Egypt